That's Hockey (currently known as 7-Eleven That's Hockey for sponsorship reasons) is a Canadian television series on TSN which presents the latest news in hockey as well as panelists and interviews with hockey personalities. The current host is Gino Reda. The opening and closing theme song was composed by Canadian musicians Andy Curran and Greg Godovitz.

History
The show debuted in October 1995 with Dave Hodge as host. It replaced TSN Inside Sports, which Hodge also hosted.  Gord Miller hosted the show from 1998 to 2002. The show got its name from former TSN broadcaster Jim Hughson exclaiming "That's Hockey!" during exciting plays.

On October 8, 2014, TSN announced that Tim Hortons would become title sponsor of the program. Molson was the former sponsor. In 2018, 7-Eleven became title sponsor.

Format
The show airs at 7:00pm ET on nights when TSN isn't airing live sports coverage in that time slot. If TSN is airing a hockey game at 7:00, they usually air the spin-off show That's Hockey 2Nite following the game at 9:30pm ET on the main network. An NHL on TSN analyst will join Reda for the program on most nights. These analysts include Darren Dreger, Bob McKenzie, Ray Ferraro, and Keith Jones, among others.

That's Hockey: The Playoff Edition
During the playoffs That's Hockey: Playoff Edition airs instead. Times of this show will vary because of TSN's Stanley Cup Playoff coverage. Otherwise the show is the same as the regular season version. During the Stanley Cup Final TSN, airs That's Hockey: Stanley Cup Final Edition. On game nights this will air for a full hour. Gino is joined by three or four NHL on TSN analysts. These include Darren Dreger, Bob McKenzie and Pierre McGuire.

Spin Offs

That's Hockey 2Nite
The aforementioned spin-off, That's Hockey 2Nite debuted February 1, 2011 on TSN2. The show was hosted by Steve Kouleas until 2014. The show ends with a segment called "Who Won the Night?". Glenn Schiiler was the last host. The 2016-17 NHL season marked the end of the show, getting replaced by SC with Jay and Dan.

That's Hockey 2Day
The hosts also hosted a noon to 1pm show called That's Hockey 2 Day.

References

1990s Canadian sports television series
2000s Canadian sports television series
2010s Canadian sports television series
1995 Canadian television series debuts
National Hockey League on television
The Sports Network original programming
2017 Canadian television series endings